Lophomyrmex is a genus of ants in the subfamily Myrmicinae. It is known from the Oriental and Indo-Australian regions.

Species
Lophomyrmex ambiguus Rigato, 1994
Lophomyrmex bedoti Emery, 1893
Lophomyrmex birmanus Emery, 1893
Lophomyrmex changlangensis Sheela & Ghosh, 2008
Lophomyrmex kali Rigato, 1994
Lophomyrmex longicornis Rigato, 1994
Lophomyrmex lucidus Menozzi, 1930
Lophomyrmex opaciceps Viehmeyer, 1922
Lophomyrmex quadrispinosus (Jerdon, 1851)
Lophomyrmex striatulus Rigato, 1994
Lophomyrmex taivanae Forel, 1912
Lophomyrmex terraceensis Bharti & Kumar, 2012

References

External links

Myrmicinae
Ant genera
Hymenoptera of Asia
Hymenoptera of Australia